Peter McNulty is a film editor. McNulty was co-nominated (with Leslie Jones) for the Chicago Film Critics Association Awards 2012, the San Diego Film Critics Society Awards 2012 and the Online Film Critics Society Awards 2012 for Best Editing for his work on The Master.

Filmography

References

American film editors
Living people
Year of birth missing (living people)